Little Sitkin Island is a volcanic island in the Rat Islands archipelago of the Western Aleutian Islands, Alaska, about  east of Davidof Island. Great Sitkin Island (which is essentially the same size as Little Sitkin) lies  further east in the Andreanof Islands.

The interior is extremely rugged and mountainous; only the lower slopes are grass covered. Numerous streams are on the island but no lakes or ponds. Small steam jets and hot springs are in the valley at the head of William Cove on the northwest of the island.

Volcano
Little Sitkin is a stratovolcano that erupted circa 1776, 1828 and 1900. The 1776 eruption shows signs of being explosive. The volcano has had three cone building episodes separated by the formation of two calderas.

The active stratovolcano on Little Sitkin Island occurs within the eroded remnants of a nested double caldera of probable late Pleistocene age. The caldera formed at the site of a large stratovolcano, the remnants of which are the oldest rocks exposed on the island.

A cataclysmic eruption, possibly in early post-glacial time, resulted in the formation of a second, smaller caldera (Caldera Two) that partially destroyed this cone. Caldera Two is elliptical in outline and measures ; the inferred eastern and southern margins are coincident with those of Caldera One. Field relations suggest that the northern boundary of Caldera Two is a hinge along which a large block, comprising most of the Caldera One stratovolcano, was tilted southward during the caldera eruption. The highest peak on the island is on the post-caldera remnant of the second cone.

The deposit is thought to have been emplaced by one or more pyroclastic flows, possibly associated with formation of Caldera Two.

Post-Caldera Two deposits are mainly lava flows. Two relatively recent aa flows have well developed levees; one originated from the breached central crater of Little Sitkin volcano, and the other from a fissure along the western trace of the Caldera One boundary fault.

On June 23, 2014, a magnitude 7.9 earthquake struck near the island. Citizens were ordered to evacuate. Tsunami warnings were soon issued.

Flora and fauna
Vegetation is mainly low leafy plants, moss, sedge and grass that grows extensively in altitudes below , with very few woody plants. There has historically been a population of Arctic foxes, which numbered 250 in 1930, subsisting on echinoderms, snails, and insects. Small populations of sea birds and marine invertebrates have also been found.

See also
List of volcanoes in the United States

References

External links
 Little Sitkin Photos Photographs from Little Sitkin Island, July 2008
 

Rat Islands
Volcanoes of Alaska
Calderas of Alaska
Stratovolcanoes of the United States
Islands of Alaska
Islands of Unorganized Borough, Alaska
Volcanoes of Unorganized Borough, Alaska
Landforms of Aleutians West Census Area, Alaska
Pleistocene calderas
Pleistocene stratovolcanoes
Holocene stratovolcanoes